The year 2017 is the 14th year in the history of the Wu Lin Feng, a Chinese kickboxing promotion. Events are broadcast on Henan Television every Saturday 21:15.

List of events

Wu Lin Feng 2017: China VS Spain

Wu Lin Feng 2017: China VS Spain was a kickboxing event held on December 03, 2017 in China.

Results

Wu Lin Feng 2017: China VS Canada

Wu Lin Feng 2017: China VS Canada was a kickboxing event held on December 02, 2017 in Zhengzhou, China.

Results

Wu Lin Feng 2017: WCK Muaythai vs Wu Lin Feng

Wu Lin Feng 2017: WCK Muaythai vs Wu Lin Feng was a kickboxing event held on November 18, 2017 at The Orleans in Las Vegas.

Results

Wu Lin Feng 2017: Yi Long VS Sitthichai

Wu Lin Feng 2017: Yi Long VS Sitthichai was a kickboxing event held on November 4, 2017 at the Kunming Sports Center Gymnasium in Kunming, China.

Results

Wu Lin Feng 2017: World Championship Hong Kong

Wu Lin Feng 2017: World Championship Hong Kong was a kickboxing event held on October 14, 2017 at the Wanchai Southorn Stadium in Hong Kong.

Results

Wu Lin Feng 2017: WLF VS ACB & ACB KB 11

Wu Lin Feng 2017: WLF VS ACB & ACB KB 11 was a kickboxing event held on October 7, 2017 at the Henan TV Studio 8 in Zhengzhou, China.

Results

2017 WLF Yi Long challenge Tournament −71 kg bracket

[1] Chingiz Allazov injured, Dzhabar Askerov substitutes for battle.

Wu Lin Feng 2017: World Championship Xi'an

Wu Lin Feng 2017: World Championship Xi'an was a kickboxing event held on September 2, 2017 at the Xi'an City Sports Park Gymnasium in Xi'an, China.

Results

2017 WLF World Championship Tournament −63 kg bracket

Wu Lin Feng 2017: New Zealand VS China

Wu Lin Feng 2017: New Zealand VS China was a kickboxing event held on August 19, 2017 at the ASB Stadium in Auckland, New Zealand.

Results

Wu Lin Feng 2017: China VS Thailand

Wu Lin Feng 2017: China VS Thailand was a kickboxing event held on August 5, 2017 at the Henan TV Studio 8 in Zhengzhou, China.

Results

Wu Lin Feng 2017: Russia VS China & ACB KB 10

Wu Lin Feng 2017: Russia VS China & ACB KB 10 was a kickboxing event held on July 15, 2017 at the Izmailovo Sports Palace in Moscow, Russia.

Results

Wu Lin Feng 2017: China VS Spain

Wu Lin Feng 2017: China VS Spain was a kickboxing event held on July 1, 2017 at the Henan TV Studio 8 in Zhengzhou, Henan, China.

Results

Wu Lin Feng 2017: Australia VS China

Wu Lin Feng 2017: Australia VS China was a kickboxing event held on June 24, 2017 at the Luna Park Sydney in Sydney, Australia.

Results

Wu Lin Feng 2017: Romania VS China

Wu Lin Feng 2017: Romania VS China or GFC 2: Romania VS China was a kickboxing event promoted by the Wu Lin Feng in association with Golden Fighter Championship on June 16, 2017 at the Sala Constantin Jude in Timișoara, Romania.

The event aired live on Digi Sport. It will also be covered by Henan TV.

Romania beat China 6-4.

Background
This event featured a fight between Wu Lin Feng intercontinental champion Hao Guanghua and Bogdan Stoica as headliner.

Results

Wu Lin Feng 2017: China VS Japan

Wu Lin Feng 2017: China VS Japan was a kickboxing event held on June 3, 2017 at the Helong Gymnasium in Changsha, China.

Results

Wu Lin Feng 2017: East VS West

Wu Lin Feng 2017: East VS West was a kickboxing event held on May 16, 2017 at the Hershey Centre in Mississauga, Ontario, Canada.

Results

Wu Lin Feng 2017: -63kg World Tournament

Wu Lin Feng 2017: -63kg World Tournament was a kickboxing event held on May 6, 2017 at the Henan TV Studio 8 in Zhengzhou, Henan, China.

Results

2017 WLF World Championship Tournament −60 kg bracket

1 Eduard Mikhovich Retire, Wang Junyu Substitute play.

2017 WLF World Championship Group A Tournament −63 kg bracket

2017 WLF World Championship Group B Tournament −63 kg bracket

Wu Lin Feng 2017: Thailand VS China

Wu Lin Feng 2017: Thailand VS China was a kickboxing event, The result of " S1 World Championship " Thai New Year 2017 , April 15, 2017 At Central Park Rama 2 in Bangkok, Thailand.

Results

Wu Lin Feng 2017: China VS Europe

Wu Lin Feng 2017: China VS Europe was a kickboxing event held on April 1, 2017 at the Henan TV Studio 8 in Zhengzhou, Henan, China.

Results

2017 WLF World Championship Group C Tournament −60 kg bracket

1 Umar overweight 1.9 kg, Zhu Shuai promotion.

2017 WLF World Championship Group D Tournament −60 kg bracket

Wu Lin Feng 2017: Kung Fu VS Muay Thai

Wu Lin Feng 2017: Kung Fu VS Muay Thai was a kickboxing event held on March 4, 2017 at the Henan TV Studio 8 in Zhengzhou, Henan, China.

Results

2017 WLF World Championship Group A Tournament −60 kg bracket

2017 WLF World Championship Group B Tournament −60 kg bracket

Wu Lin Feng 2017: Battle of the Golden Triangle

Wu Lin Feng 2017: Battle of the Golden Triangle was a kickboxing event held on February 10, 2017 at the Golden Triangle Special Economic Zone, Bokeo Province, Laos.

Results

Wu Lin Feng World Championship 2017

Wu Lin Feng World Championship 2017 was a kickboxing event held on January 14, 2017 at the Henan TV Studio 8 in Zhengzhou, Henan, China.

Results

2017 WLF World 8 Man Tournament −63 kg bracket

2016 WLF World Championship Tournament −70 kg bracket 

(1) Ben Moh injured exit.

See also
2017 in Glory
2017 in Glory of Heroes
2017 in Kunlun Fight

References

2017 in kickboxing
Kickboxing in China
Sport in Timișoara